The 1999 European Speedway Club Champions' Cup.

Group B

 June 27, 1999
  Santarem

Group A

 July 11, 1999
  Rivne

Final

 September 11, 1999
  Diedenbergen

See also

1999
Euro C